The National Reunification Prize is an award of North Korea, bestowed by the Presidium of the Supreme People's Assembly upon people who have contributed to the reunification of Korea. The award was instituted in 1990.

Recipients

 An Ji-saeng
 An U-saeng
 Ryu Mi-yong

1990
 Moon Ik-hwan
 Yun I-sang

1998
 Kim Chaek
 Kang Ryang-uk
 Ho Jong-suk
 Kim Jong-thae
 Choe Yong-do
 Hong Myong-hui
 Ho Hon
 Kim Ku
 Kim Kyu-sik
 Rim Su-gyong
 Kim Ki-hyon
 Jo Nam-jin
 Ryo Yon-gu
 Phyo Mu-won

1999
 Kim Pyong-sik
 O Ik-je

2000

The 63 unconverted long-term prisoners repatriated in 2000.

2005
 Kim Yong-sun
 Kang Ung-jin
 Son Song-phil
 Ju Chang-jun
 Ryo Won-gu
 Song Ho-gyong
 Nam Sung-u
 Ho Nam-gi
 Yang In-won
 Cha Sang-bo
 Sok Myong-son

2007
 Rim Tong-ok
 Han Ung-sik
 Pak Ryol
 Yun Song-sik
 Jong In-sok
 Ri U-song
 Jong In-bo
 Jang Pyong-thae
 Kim Jong-sik
 Yun Kum-sok
 An Hung-gap
 Han Hak-su
 Ri Jung-rak
 Kim Yong-sul

2012
 Kim Jung-rin
 Moon Sun-myung

See also

Korean reunification
Orders and medals of North Korea

References

Orders, decorations, and medals of North Korea